Ol-Knuts is a Swedish island belonging to the Kalix archipelago. The island is located 400 meter south of Fåröholmarna. The island has no shore connection, and only a summer cottage as building.

References 

Islands of Sweden